Lewis Alfred Vasquez Tenorio (born July 9, 1984) is a Filipino professional basketball player for the Barangay Ginebra San Miguel of the Philippine Basketball Association (PBA). He is also an assistant coach for the Letran Knights of the Philippines' NCAA.

He was nicknamed Showtime while he was on Alaska due to his speed, scoring and skills, and The Tinyente due to the initials of his name (L.T.). In Barangay Ginebra, he earned the nickname GINeral (combination of Ginebra's product, gin, and the word general) for his great skills as a point guard and his passing ability.

Early life and high school years 
Tenorio started playing basketball when he was 6 years old. No one really saw him play or his potential, but he tried his luck to join a basketball team when he was in grade three at Don Bosco Makati. He, then in sixth grade, played a nationally televised exhibition game in front of a PBA audience. His team faced the Ateneo Grade School's Small Basketeers Team. Tenorio's team did not win, but he pretty much stole the show, scoring 31 points in only 21 minutes of play.

After his elementary days were over, he first went to Adamson under coach Charlie Dy before eventually transferring to San Beda under legendary bench tactician Ato Badolato. LA became part of a Bedan squad that was rife with future collegiate stars – Magnum Membrere, Arjun Cordero, Toti Almeda, and Jon Jon Tabique. He won a title in his junior year, but finished just third in his last year with the Red Cubs.

College and amateur career
Tenorio made an immediate impact as a rookie for the Blue Eagles of Ateneo de Manila as he helped lead his team into the 2001 basketball Finals of the University Athletic Association of the Philippines (UAAP). He was practically unstoppable in Game 3 of the Best-of-3 Finals Series as he scored 30 points against their college rival De La Salle University-Manila. DLSU-Manila however would go on to win that series.

The following year, in 2002, he would once again lead the Ateneo de Manila back to the UAAP Finals. This time he and his team would not be denied as they exacted vengeance on DLSU-Manila to win the UAAP Men's Seniors basketball championship.

He would make a third straight Finals appearance in 2003 but he and his Blue Eagle team would yield their crown to the veteran Far Eastern University Tamaraws.

He played a total of five seasons with Ateneo de Manila and also graduated with a Bachelor of Arts degree in 2006, something he considers a far more important achievement than any of the basketball accolades he ever got. He played under four college coaches: Joe Lipa, Joel Banal, Sandy Arespacochaga and Norman Black.

After completing his collegiate eligibility he then saw action in the quasi-commercial basketball league of the Philippines, the Philippine Basketball League (PBL) the last stepping stone towards achieving a professional basketball career. In his last PBL Conference he led his Harbour Centre Portmasters team to the 2006 PBL Unity Cup championship, a fitting end to his career as an amateur player.

PBA career
During the 2006 PBA draft, Tenorio was the fourth overall draft pick by the San Miguel Beermen. He played an average of 25.5 minutes for Magnolia with a respectable average of 7.8 points, 4.6 assists and 3.6 rebounds in nine games.

In a surprise move in March 2008, he and Larry Fonacier were traded to Alaska Aces for Mike Cortez and Ken Bono. The Aces have been happy with the trade as they got a pure point guard in Tenorio to make life easier for Willie Miller who could now concentrate on his scoring.

In the first four games of the 2009–2010 KFC-PBA Philippine Cup, Tenorio did not disappoint Alaska's expectation. As a starting point guard Tenorio led the Alaska team to a scrambling victory over San Miguel Beer in their first game. In their next three games Tenorio was ever the reliable point guard who led his team to the top of the standings in the PBA.

On August 31, 2012, Tenorio was traded to the Barangay Ginebra San Miguel in a six-player blockbuster deal. Tenorio  was also famous because of his "Pambansang reverse" which is a reverse lay up made him famous in international basketball.

On October 14, 2016, Tenorio was recognized during the PBA Leo Awards Night as he was named to the PBA Mythical Second Team. On October 19, 2016, Tenorio was named as the 2016 PBA Governor's Cup Finals Most Valuable Player after averaging 17.2 points, 4.7 assists and 3.8 rebounds against the Meralco Bolts.

On June 12, 2022, Tenorio played in his 700th consecutive game, the most consecutive games played for a PBA player. On December 10, 2022, he made his 1,178th three points field goals made and tied James Yap for third most all time. On March 1, 2023, Tenorio's consecutive games played ended at 744 due to a groin injury.

PBA career statistics

As of the end of 2021 season

Season-by-season averages

|-
| align=left | 
| align=left | San Miguel
| 62 || 22.3 || .363 || .297 || .824 || 2.5 || 3.1 || 1.0 || .0 || 8.2
|-
| align=left rowspan=2| 
| align=left | Magnolia
| rowspan=2|39 || rowspan=2|28.4 || rowspan=2|.405 || rowspan=2|.338 || rowspan=2|.701 || rowspan=2|3.6 || rowspan=2|4.5 || rowspan=2|1.2 || rowspan=2|.1 || rowspan=2|8.6
|-
| align=left | Alaska
|-
| align=left | 
| align=left | Alaska
| 47 || 33.3 || .712 || .312 || .785 || 4.2 || 4.7 || 1.1 || .0 || 11.0
|-
| align=left | 
| align=left | Alaska
| 62 || 35.3 || .399 || .337 || .844 || 4.6 || 4.6 || 1.2 || .0 || 12.8
|-
| align=left | 
| align=left | Alaska
| 42 || 35.5 || .394 || .378 || .833 || 4.8 || 4.5 || 1.3 || .1 || 13.5
|-
| align=left | 
| align=left | Alaska
| 35 || 36.1 || .373 || .246 || .800 || 5.4 || 5.4 || 1.2 || .1 || 14.0
|-
| align=left | 
| align=left | Barangay Ginebra
| 52 || 36.0 || .364 || .297 || .753 || 5.0 || 5.8 || 1.5 || .1 || 14.0
|-
| align=left | 
| align=left | Barangay Ginebra
| 43 || 32.8 || .376 || .275 || .830 || 4.3 || 5.5 || 1.3 || .1 || 11.2
|-
| align=left | 
| align=left | Barangay Ginebra
| 37 || 29.2 || .382 || .333 || .793 || 4.3 || 3.9 || 1.5 || .0 || 10.0
|-
| align=left | 
| align=left | Barangay Ginebra
| 49 || 33.7 || .433 || .387 || .804 || 4.1 || 4.5 || 1.2 || .1 || 13.0
|-
| align=left | 
| align=left | Barangay Ginebra
| 64 || 34.3 || .403 || .370 || .780 || 3.5 || 4.7 || 1.3 || .0 || 14.2
|-
| align=left | 
| align=left | Barangay Ginebra
| 57 || 35.9 || .372 || .335 || .837 || 3.5 || 4.6 || 1.6 || .1 || 12.5
|-
| align=left | 
| align=left | Barangay Ginebra
| 52 || 35.4 || .387 || .361 || .863 || 3.3 || 4.6 || 1.2 || .0 || 11.8
|-
| align=left | 
| align=left | Barangay Ginebra
| 22 || 31.3 || .423 || .400 || .750 || 2.9 || 4.6 || .8 || .1 || 9.6
|-
| align=left | 
| align=left | Barangay Ginebra
| 36 || 37.8 || .405 || .338 || .853 || 3.3 || 5.0 || .5 || .1 || 12.7
|-class=sortbottom
| align="center" colspan="2" | Career
| 699 || 33.1 || .401 || .333 || .803 || 3.9 || 4.6 || 1.2 || .1 || 11.9
|}

National team career
Tenorio made his name on the final list of the Smart Gilas 2.0 roster. The first tournament of the Gilas were the prestigious 2012 William Jones Cup which was held from August 18–26 in Taipei. Gilas had an impressive 6–1 record, before battling out the USA Team for their last game. Tenorio led the team to beat the USA team 76–75, finishing with 20 points and grabbing the most important rebound of the game. Gilas won the tournament with a 7–1 record, and the 4th championship of the Philippines in the Jones Cup. Tenorio eventually became the tournament's Most Valuable Player after his last performance against the tough USA Team.

References

1984 births
Living people
2014 FIBA Basketball World Cup players
Alaska Aces (PBA) players
Asian Games competitors for the Philippines
Ateneo Blue Eagles men's basketball players
Barangay Ginebra San Miguel players
Basketball players at the 2014 Asian Games
Basketball players from Batangas
Competitors at the 2019 Southeast Asian Games
Filipino men's basketball coaches
Filipino men's basketball players
Letran Knights basketball coaches
Philippine Basketball Association All-Stars
Philippines men's national basketball team players
Point guards
San Beda University alumni
San Miguel Beermen draft picks
San Miguel Beermen players
Southeast Asian Games gold medalists for the Philippines
Southeast Asian Games medalists in basketball